Constantin Ionescu may refer to:

 Constantin Ionescu (politician), Romanian politician, mayor of Chişinău
 Constantin Ionescu (chess player), Romanian chess player

See also
 Constantin Ionescu-Mihăești, Romanian physician